The Official America's Cup Sailing Simulation is a 1986 video game developed by Wargaming Australia Pty. Ltd. and published by Electronic Arts.

Gameplay
The Official America's Cup Sailing Simulation is a game in which the player uses wind conditions, and must make sure to use the correct sail in a sailing simulation.

Reception
Russell Sipe reviewed the game for Computer Gaming World, and stated that "If you enjoyed watching the America's Cup or just want a good sail racing game, AC is just your "cup of tea"."

Reviews
Computer and Video Games - Feb, 1987
ASM (Aktueller Software Markt) - Jan, 1987

References

External links 
The Official America's Cup Sailing Simulation on IMDb
The Official America's Cup Sailing Simulation on MobyGames
Article in Ahoy!
Review in Commodore Magazine
Review in RUN Magazine

1986 video games
Amstrad CPC games
Commodore 64 games
Electronic Arts games
Sailing simulators
Sailing video games
Video games developed in Australia